Los Minerales is a census-designated place (CDP) in Webb County, Texas, United States. This was a new CDP formed from parts of the Ranchos Penitas West CDP and additional area prior to the 2010 census with a population of 20.

It is one of several colonias in the county.

Geography
Los Minerales is located at  (27.655483, -99.617827).

Education
Residents are in the United Independent School District. Zoned schools include: Julia Bird Jones Muller Elementary School, George Washington Middle School, United High School.

The designated community college for Webb County is Laredo Community College.

References

Census-designated places in Webb County, Texas
Census-designated places in Texas